Sarah Viktoria Frick (born 28 July 1982 in Chur, Switzerland) is a Swiss theatre and film actress.  She has dual nationality with Liechtenstein.  She left school at 16 to study at the Academy of Music and Theatre in Zurich and has gone on to a career celebrated for her performance as Puck in Shakespeare's A Midsummer Night's Dream, among many other roles, primarily at the Burgtheater in Vienna.  She has won the Nestroy Theatre Prize several times.

References

Living people
Swiss stage actresses
1982 births
People from Chur
Swiss film actresses